The first USS Undine was a "tinclad" steamer in the United States Navy in 1864, during the American Civil War. She was captured on 30 October and put in service with the Confederates, but was not renamed before being burned, 5 days later, to prevent re-capture.

Undine was built in 1863 at Cincinnati, Ohio, as Ben Gaylord. She was purchased by the Navy at Cincinnati on 7 March 1864 and commissioned there in April.

Civil War operations
Undine joined the Mississippi Squadron and, in May 1864, was deployed in the Mississippi River between Fort Adams and Natchez, Mississippi. She soon left the Mississippi and operated during early July in the Tennessee River in support of Union forces ashore. While standing off Clifton, Tennessee, Undine, Acting Master John L. Bryant in command, struck a snag and partially sank on 25 July. Her crew was able to transfer the ship's guns ashore to defend Clifton from Confederate attack before taking measures to raise the vessel. Undine was successfully refloated on 1 August after the arrival of the pump steamer Little Champion on 31 July.

Undine, and transports City of Pekin, Kenton, and Aurora left Clifton on 9 October on an expedition to capture Eastport, Mississippi. This operation was launched to prevent cavalry forces under Confederate General Nathan Bedford Forrest from crossing the Tennessee River at Eastport and to provide an outpost against an expected advance of General Hood. However, the Union force was ambushed by shore batteries on 10 October as it landed troops near Eastport. After a heated, 30-minute exchange with the batteries, Undine and Key West evacuated troops caught ashore in the withering crossfire and escorted the disabled transports back downstream. The battered expedition returned to Paducah, Kentucky, at sundown on 12 October.

After repairs were completed, Undine resumed patrol and reconnaissance duty along the Tennessee River. On 30 October, she convoyed the transport Anna from Johnsonville, Tennessee, to Sandy Island. While returning to Johnsonville, Acting Master Bryant heard artillery reports coming from the river below Sandy Island and ordered Undine turned about to investigate. Near Paris Landing, Undine was again ambushed. Transports Venus and Cheeseman soon joined her and engaged the Confederates. Three hours later, both transports were disabled, and Undine was out of ammunition and crippled by a broken engine. Bryant hauled down his flag and surrendered Undine, Venus, and Cheeseman. He was later exonerated by a board of inquiry.

The Confederates wasted little time putting the captured Union vessels to use. While patrolling the Tennessee River on 2 November, Key West and  engaged Undine and Venus. Venus was retaken, but Undine escaped, badly damaged, to the protection of Confederate batteries at Reynoldsburg Island. There, she was burned by the Confederates on 4 November to prevent her recapture by Union gunboats attacking the island.

Post Civil War
After the Civil War, the hulk of Undine was one of several in the Tennessee River ordered raised or wrecked on 20 June 1865. Two 24 pounder howitzers were recovered from the vessel later that month.

In 2000, a group called "Raise the Gunboats" in Benton County, Tennessee attempted to salvage the remaining portions of the Undine. The group has had mixed success, with some artifacts from the gunboat recovered as well as a derrick boat from the turn of the century.

See also

Union Navy
Anaconda Plan
Mississippi Squadron

References

Ships of the Union Navy
Ships built in Cincinnati
Steamships of the United States Navy
Gunboats of the United States Navy
American Civil War patrol vessels of the United States
Ohio in the American Civil War
1863 ships
Shipwrecks of the American Civil War
Shipwrecks in rivers
Shipwrecks of the Mississippi River
Maritime incidents in July 1864